Basketball Club Etzella, better known simply as Etzella, is a Luxembourgish professional basketball club based in Ettelbruck. The club competes in the Total League. The team has won the national championship 15 times.

Notable players

Ronnie Harrell (born 1996)

References

External links
Official website 
Eurobasket.com Team Page

Basketball teams in Luxembourg